The Huntington Hotel is one of the landmark luxury hotels at the top of the Nob Hill district of San Francisco, California. It is located at 1075 California Street, corner of Taylor Street. The hotel is a twelve-story, Georgian-style brick building that features 135 guest rooms and suites. It is currently closed.

Description 
The hotel is named after Collis P. Huntington, one of the Big Four railroad tycoons of the Old West. However, it is across California Street from the location of Huntington's mansion, on the site of a mansion owned by the Tobin family, founders of the Hibernia Bank. It was originally designed by Weeks and Day as the Huntington Apartments in 1922, and was converted to a hotel by real estate developer Eugene Fritz, who bought the property in 1924. Fritz's grandchildren ran the hotel until selling it in 2011 to Singapore-based Grace International. The hotel closed on January 4, 2014, and reopened in May 2014 as The Scarlet Huntington, following a $15 million renovation. The hotel was sold to Los Angeles-based Woodridge Capital on September 28, 2018 for $51.9 million, and returned to its historic name, the Huntington Hotel. The hotel closed again in early 2020, due to the COVID-19 pandemic. In September 2022, it was announced that the hotel would remain closed, because the owners had defaulted on the hotel's $56.2 million mortgage, and the lender, Deutsche Bank was seeking to foreclose on the property.

References

External links 
 
 

Hotels in San Francisco
Landmarks in San Francisco
Nob Hill, San Francisco
Hotel buildings completed in 1922
Hotels established in 1922
Weeks and Day buildings